The 1900 Indiana Hoosiers football team was an American football team that represented Indiana University Bloomington during the 1900 Western Conference football season. In their third season under head coach James H. Horne, the Hoosiers compiled a 4–2–2 record and outscored their opponents by a combined total of 110 to 29.

Schedule

References

Indiana
Indiana Hoosiers football seasons
Indiana Hoosiers football